Lacydoides is a genus of moths in the subfamily Arctiinae. It contains the single species Lacydoides tibetensis, which is found in Tibet.

References

Natural History Museum Lepidoptera generic names catalog

Lithosiini